Andrew P. Learned is an American politician. He is a Democrat who represented the 59th district in the Florida House of Representatives for a single two-year term before losing re-election in 2022.

Early life and education

Learned holds a Bachelor of Arts degree from the University of Tampa. Learned served in the United States Navy for four years before transferring to the United States Navy Reserve in 2013. He deployed to the Middle East three times.

Career

In 2018, Learned ran for election to represent Florida's 15th Congressional District, placing second in a three-way Democratic primary.

In 2020, he ran to represent the 59th district in the Florida House of Representatives. He was unopposed in the Democratic primary, and narrowly defeated Republican Michael Owen in the general election.

In 2022, Learned ran for re-election in the 69th district but lost to Republican Danny Alvarez by a 14 point margin.

Electoral record

References 

Living people
Democratic Party members of the Florida House of Representatives
21st-century American politicians
1986 births